The 1908–09 season was the sixth competitive season in the history of Plymouth Argyle Football Club.

References
General

Specific

External links
Plymouth Argyle F.C. official website
Plymouth Argyle F.C. archive

1908-09
English football clubs 1908–09 season